KBNO-FM (89.3 FM) was a radio station in White Salmon, Washington, United States. It was supported by donations.

The station's license was cancelled by the Federal Communications Commission on September 30, 2014, for failure to file a renewal application.

External links
KBNO Website

BNO-FM
BNO-FM
Defunct radio stations in the United States
Radio stations disestablished in 2014
2014 disestablishments in Washington (state)
BNO-FM